Jerzy Leszczyński (1884–1959) was a Polish stage and film actor.

He was married to the actresses  and Anna Belina (1884-1974).

Selected filmography
 Pan Tadeusz (1928)
 Barbara Radziwiłłówna (1936)
 Wierna rzeka (1936)
 Halka (1937)
 Border Street (1948)

References

Bibliography
 Marek Haltof. Polish Film and the Holocaust: Politics and Memory. Berghahn Books, 2012.

External links

1884 births
1959 deaths
Polish male film actors
Polish male silent film actors
20th-century Polish male actors
Polish male stage actors
Male actors from Warsaw
People from Warsaw Governorate
Recipients of the State Award Badge (Poland)